"" is a Swedish-language song by Swedish hip hop duo Medina, released as a single on 26 February 2022. It was performed in Melodifestivalen 2022 and made it to the final on 12 March 2022, where it finished third.

Charts

Weekly charts

Year-end charts

References

2022 songs
2022 singles
Melodifestivalen songs of 2022
Songs written by Wrethov
Songs written by Jimmy Thörnfeldt